The following is a list of notable events and releases of the year 1886 in Norwegian music.

Events

Deaths

Births

 May
 18 – Ole Windingstad, pianist and composer (died 1959).

See also
 1886 in Norway
 Music of Norway

References

 
Norwegian music
Norwegian
Music
1880s in Norwegian music